Mohammed Hamad Hidaib Al-Mukhaini (born 2 December 1982), commonly known as Mohammed Al-Mukhaini, is an Omani footballer who plays for Sur SC.

Club career
On 26 August 2014, he signed a one-year contract with Sur SC.

Club career statistics

International career
Mohammed was selected for the national team for the first time in 2010. He has made appearances in the 2002 FIFA World Cup qualification, the 2004 AFC Asian Cup qualification, the 2004 AFC Asian Cup, the 2006 FIFA World Cup qualification, the 2007 AFC Asian Cup qualification and the 2014 FIFA World Cup qualification.

Honours

Club

With Al-Oruba
Omani League (2): 1999–00, 2001-02; Runner-up 2000-01, 2004-05
Sultan Qaboos Cup (1): 2001; Runner-up 2000
Omani Super Cup (2): 2001, 2002

With Al-Salmiya
Kuwait Emir Cup (0): 2007, 2008

References

External links
 
 
 Mohamed Hamed at Goal.com
 
 

1982 births
Living people
Omani footballers
Oman international footballers
Association football midfielders
Al-Orouba SC players
Al Salmiya SC players
Sur SC players
Omani expatriate footballers
Omani expatriate sportspeople in Kuwait
Expatriate footballers in Kuwait
Kuwait Premier League players